Anne Katherine "Annie" McNamara is a fictional character on the American television series Nip/Tuck.  Annie is played by Kelsey Batelaan.

Character history
Annie first appears on the show in the pilot episode. Here she is shown as going back to school, allowing her mother, Julia, to go back to medical school. She also adopts the class pet gerbil, Frisky. Julia later kills the pet but buys a new one and does not tell Annie.

In Season 2, Annie, at the age of 8, starts puberty. Annie's friend's mother throws Annie a "Princess Menses" party and invites her friends to celebrate the passage to womanhood.

In Season 3, Annie has to talk to Family Services about her father Sean's anger problem. She leads them to believe, unintentionally, that he may be physically abusive and that he has emotionally affected her. She is briefly taken away from Sean until further notice. She is then put to stay with Julia.

In Season 4, Annie learns that her mother is going to give birth to a boy with syndactyly, a webbing of the fingers and toes. Annie, in a sincere attempt to understand this birth defect, tapes her fingers together to understand how her brother would feel and alters her dolls' hands to have the same appearance. Sean and Julia interpret this as mockery, and Julia forces Annie to throw out her modified toys. Julia gives birth to a boy, Conor, and Annie is uncomfortable with him because of his handicap. She is taken away by her mother when Julia leaves for New York City towards the end of the season.

In Season 5, Annie is living with Julia, her new girlfriend Olivia Lord, and Olivia's sociopathic daughter Eden. Eden, under the guise of being a caring "older sister," encourages Annie to lose weight to attract the attention of a boy she likes. She even asks Sean to perform liposuction on her, but he forbids it. After a failed attempt at inducing bulimia, Eden encourages Annie to move onto "Plan C." The next day, Sean gets a call from Julia saying Annie has been expelled from her school for being caught performing fellatio on the boy she has a crush on. Sean, knowing Eden put her up to it, threatens Eden to stay away from her and him. In the final episode of the season, Annie is seriously hurt by a car crash with Sean's friend Christian Troy when they are trying to escape the paparazzi. She is being operated on by Sean in the last scene.

In Season 6, Annie is now a teenager and is openly resentful against her parents after their separation. Things are made worse after Sean abruptly marries Teddy. During a visit with her father, Sean discovers that Annie has been pulling her hair out and ingesting it (a stress reaction known as "Rapunzel Syndrome"). Annie suffers a severe abdominal cramp due to the ingested hair and undergoes surgery to remove it. Soon afterwards, Sean decides to double his life insurance policy and makes Annie and Conor the sole beneficiaries. (Matt was not included because he wasted the money Sean gave him from selling his house in Miami.) Teddy attempts to kill Annie, Connor, and Sean in order to get the insurance money, but he fails.

Future (Sean's dream)
In the episode "Conor McNamara, 2026," Annie is 30 years old (played by Jennifer Elise Cox).  Years of being the ignored middle child and separation from her father has resulted in her being afflicted with severe personality problems.  She is bulimic, extremely jealous of her brother, and is caught stealing painkillers from the hospital where Conor is having his surgery. She attempts to shock her family by dating an African-American bisexual man and announcing at dinner that she just had an abortion. Throughout the episode she also chain-smokes and mentions several of the incidents above, such as Julia flushing her gerbil, throwing away her dolls, the party for her period, and Sean running out on the family. In the Season 5: part two premiere, "Ronny Chase", Sean reveals that the events of "Conor McNamara, 2026" was a dream he had during his break-up with Julia.

See also

Nip/Tuck characters
Fictional characters from Los Angeles
Fictional characters from Miami
Television characters introduced in 2003
American female characters in television
Child characters in television